Dmitri Barkov (born 28 October 1880, date of death unknown) was a Russian sport shooter who competed in the 1912 Summer Olympics.

He was born in Helsinki, Grand Duchy of Finland.

In 1912 he was a member of the Russian team which finished fifth in the team 100 metre running deer, single shots competition. In the 100 metre running deer, single shots event he finished 31st and in the 100 metre running deer, double shots competition he finished 19th.

References

1880 births
Year of death missing
Russian male sport shooters
Running target shooters
Olympic shooters of Russia
Shooters at the 1912 Summer Olympics